Newtownabbey was a single-member county constituency of the Parliament of Northern Ireland.

Boundaries and boundary changes
Before 1969, the area formed part of the Northern Ireland Parliament constituencies of Antrim Borough and Carrick.

Newtownabbey was created by the Electoral Law Act (Northern Ireland) 1968 as a division of County Antrim. It was located to the north of Belfast and comprised "part of the urban district of Newtownabbey which consists of the wards of Carnmoney, Cavehill, Glengormley, Whitehouse, and Whitewell".

The constituency sent one MP to the House of Commons of Northern Ireland from the 1969 Northern Ireland general election. The Parliament was prorogued on 30 March 1972, under the terms of the Northern Ireland (Temporary Provisions) Act 1972. It was formally abolished in 1973 when the Northern Ireland Constitution Act 1973 received Royal Assent on 18 July 1973.

The Parliamentary representative of the division was elected using the first-past-the-post system.

Member of Parliament: House of Commons (Northern Ireland)

Election: House of Commons (Northern Ireland)

 Parliament prorogued 30 March 1972 and abolished 18 July 1973

References
 Northern Ireland Parliamentary Election Results 1921-1972, compiled and edited by Sydney Elliott (Political Reference Publications 1973)
Northern Ireland House of Commons, 1921 - 1972

External links
 For more information about the Northern Ireland House of Commons, see http://www.election.demon.co.uk/stormont/stormont.html 

Constituencies of the Northern Ireland Parliament
Northern Ireland Parliament constituencies established in 1969
Historic constituencies in County Antrim
Northern Ireland Parliament constituencies disestablished in 1973